Rukometni klub Rudar is a Montenegrin handball club from Pljevlja, that plays in Montenegrin First Handball League.

History

Formed in 1957, RK Rudar was one of the leading Montenegrin handball clubs in SFR Yugoslavia. It was the first Montenegrin handball club which participated in Yugoslav First League, during the season 1964/65.

After the breakup of SFR Yugoslavia, RK Rudar was renamed into RK Pljevlja and during the decade played in the Second League - 'West'. Because in Pljevlja didn't exist a big sports hall, club played their home games in Podgorica, Nikšić, Berane, Tivat, Priboj or Užice.

At the start of 21st century, in 2001, in Pljevlja was built Sports hall Ada, with capacity of 3,000 seats. At the same year, after almost four decades, RK Pljevlja made their second promotion in the First Yugoslav League. In that competitions, club spent four next seasons.

Following the Montenegrin independence, Pljevlja played one season in the Montenegrin First League. After the relegation and one season spent in Second Handball League, the club was back in the First League, under the old name - RK Rudar.

First League seasons

In the SFR Yugoslavia and FR Yugoslavia/Serbia and Montenegro, RK Rudar participated in the First League during the eight seasons: 1964/65, 2001/02, 2002/03, 2003/04, 2004/05.

After the Montenegrin independence, Rudar played in the Montenegrin First League during the seasons 2006/07, 2008/09, 2009/10, 2010/11, 2011/12, 2014/15.

European Cups

Rudar played one season in the EHF European competitions:

2010/11 - EHF Challenge Cup

Matches

Famous players
  Nedim Selmanovic
  Nenad Peruničić
  Predrag Peruničić
  Almir Mlatišuma
  Boban Knežević
  Goran Cmiljanić
  Radan Rovčanin
  Nemanja Grbović
 Nikola Grujicic
 Nemanja Grujicic
 Vladan Anicic
 Slavisa Lacmanovic
 Goran Andjelic
 Denijal Lukas
 Nemanja Matovic
 Nemanja Vojinovic
 Filip Milovic

External links
Handball Federation of Montenegro

Rudar
Handball clubs established in 1957
1957 establishments in Montenegro
Pljevlja